Travel to the Kingdom of Bhutan is highly regulated under the policy "High Value, Low Volume" Tourism in order to minimize the effect on the country's unique society and environment. Bhutanese policy ensures that only a sustainable number of tourists enter the country at any one time, preventing it from being overwhelmed by mass tourism and thus altering its character, and that the tourists who do come get the best experience and values out of their visits.

Visa policy map

Visa exemption

Freedom of movement 
Citizens of  do not need a visa to enter Bhutan, because the 1949 Treaty between Bhutan and India allows for free movement of people between the two nations on a reciprocal basis. From 23 September 2022, this freedom of movement is now restricted to travel within the border towns of Phuentsholing, Gelephu, and Samdrup Jongkhar. Travel beyond these border towns will require pre-arranged permits.

Since 1 July 2020, visitors from India, Bangladesh and Maldives are required to pay a concessional Sustainable Development Fee of BTN 1,200 per night to obtain a permit to enter Bhutan.

Indian citizens are required to obtain a permit before entry into Bhutan by air and land, and may use any of the acceptable documents mentioned below to enter Bhutan:

Indian Passport
Voter ID card with photograph

Visa on arrival 
Citizens of the following countries can obtain a visa upon arrival in Bhutan.

Diplomatic, service and official passports 

Holders of diplomatic or official passports of the following countries can obtain a visa on arrival at their port of entry.

Visa required in advance 
All foreigners (except for citizens of Bangladesh and Maldives) must obtain a visa, while Indian nationals must obtain a permit before visiting Bhutan and may only enter Bhutan through Phuntsholing, Gelephu and Samdrup Jongkhar if coming by land or Paro if coming by air. If approved, they are given a visa clearance letter, and must present it at the port of entry. The visa is then stamped into their passport. A daily Sustainable Development Fee (SDF) is also charged for every day of stay. For all foreign tourists, it amounts to $200 a day, while India nationals pay 1,200 ngultrum, or the equivalent amount in Indian rupees, per person, per night.  

Children aged 6 to 12 at the time of travel receive a 50% concessionary discount on the SDF. Those aged 5 or younger are exempt. 

Day visitors to the Bhutanese towns bordering India are also exempt from paying the SDF until they reach a point designated by the Bhutanese government.

Liberalization proposals
In 2009, the government of Bhutan hired the consulting company McKinsey to re-assess its policies on tourism. McKinsey’s plan to de-regulate tourism and allow an unlimited number of foreign tourists to enter the country was preliminarily approved by the Prime Minister and the cabinet, but finally rejected due to widespread opposition in the country. According to Canadian scholar Kent Schroeder, “the reversal of McKinsey’s liberalization proposal represented a significant triumph for many within the private sector and civil society.”

Statistics 
Most visitors arriving to Bhutan were from the following countries of nationality:

See also

Visa requirements for Bhutanese citizens

References 

Bhutan